Liezel Huber and Nadia Petrova were the defending champions but decided not to defend their title together.
Huber partnered up with Lisa Raymond but lost to Sania Mirza and Elena Vesnina in the first round.  Meanwhile, Petrova played alongside Julia Görges but lost in the second round to top seeds Květa Peschke and Katarina Srebotnik.

Mirza and Vesnina reached the final, where they won against the American pair of Bethanie Mattek-Sands and Meghann Shaughnessy 6–4, 6–4.

Seeds

Draw

Draw

External links
 Main draw

Family Circle Cup - Doubles
Charleston Open